Ottokar Pohlmann (25 July 1912 – 15 November 1995) was a German equestrian. He competed in two events at the 1960 Summer Olympics.

References

External links
 

1912 births
1995 deaths
German male equestrians
Olympic equestrians of the United Team of Germany
Equestrians at the 1960 Summer Olympics
People from Chojnice County